The following are the football (soccer) events of the year 1934 throughout the world.

Events
January 6: Steve Milton of Halifax Town sets an English league record by conceding 13 goals on his league debut for the club. The Third Division (North) match finished: Stockport County 13:0 Halifax Town.
March 3: The highest ever English attendance for a non-Cup Final of 84,569 sees Manchester City F.C. beat Stoke City F.C. 1-0 at Maine Road in the sixth round of the FA Cup.

Winners club national championship
 Argentina: Boca Juniors
 France: FC Sète
 Iceland: KR
 Italy: Juventus
 Netherlands: Ajax Amsterdam
 Poland: Ruch Chorzów
 Portugal: FC Porto
 Romania: Venus București
 Scotland:
Scottish Cup: Rangers
 Spain: Athletic Bilbao
 Turkey: Beşiktaş J.K.

International tournaments

 1934 British Home Championship (16 September 1933 – 14 April 1934)

 FIFA World Cup in Italy (May 27 – June 10, 1934)
  Italy
  Czechoslovakia
  Germany

Births
 January 21 – Alfonso Portugal, Mexican international footballer (died 2016)
 March 23 – Adel Hekal, Egyptian footballer (died 2018)
 March 28 – Kazimír Gajdoš, Czechoslovakian international footballer (died 2016)
 April 15 – David Herd, Scottish international footballer (died 2016)
 April 25 – Peter McParland, Irish footballer
 June 24 – Ferdinand Biwersi, German referee (died 2013)
 June 28 – Alfred Pyka, German international footballer (died 2012)
 July 5 – Vladislao Cap, Argentine international footballer and manager (died 1982)
 June 29
 Malcolm Handscombe, English association footballer
 Bob Wilson, Scottish association football player
 July 30 – Engelbert Kraus, German international footballer (died 2016)
 August 1 – Fernand Boone, Belgian international footballer (died 2013)
 August 17 – Ron Henry, English international footballer (died 2014)
 August 23 – Flavio Emoli, Italian international footballer (died 2015)
 August 29 – Horst Szymaniak, German international footballer (died 2009)
 October 8 – Martin Lippens, Belgian international footballer (died 2016)
 November 14 – Dave Mackay, Scottish international footballer and manager (died 2015)
 November 19 – Kurt Hamrin, Swedish international footballer
 November 27 – Ammo Baba, Assyrian soccer player (died 2009)
 December 21 – Ole Madsen, Danish international footballer (died 2006)

Deaths
 6 January - Herbert Chapman, manager of Arsenal and formerly of Huddersfield Town.

Established
 Beitar Tal Aviv - Israeli club
 Maccabi Netanya - Israeli club
Peterborough United - English club

References

 
Association football by year